The common Peru blind snake (Epictia diaplocia) is a species of snake in the family Leptotyphlopidae.

References

Epictia
Reptiles described in 1969